John Anthony Tate (6 December 1892 – 1973) was an English professional footballer who played for West Stanley and Tottenham Hotspur.

Football career 
Tate began his career at Non league club West Stanley. The goalkeeper joined Tottenham Hotspur in 1913 and played four matches  for the Lilywhites before re-joining West Stanley.

References 

1892 births
1973 deaths
Sportspeople from Chester-le-Street
Footballers from County Durham
English footballers
Association football goalkeepers
English Football League players
Tottenham Hotspur F.C. players
West Stanley F.C. players